High Steward or Lord High Steward may refer to:

High Steward (academia) in the universities of Oxford and Cambridge
High steward (Ancient Egypt), in the Middle Kingdom and the New Kingdom
High steward (civic) of various towns in England
Lord High Steward of England
Lord High Steward of Ireland
High Steward of Scotland
Lord High Steward of Sweden
High Steward of Westminster Abbey
Grand Master of France
Mayordomo mayor, High Steward of Spain
Obersthofmeister, Lord High Steward of Austria